Loso's Way is the fifth studio album by American rapper Fabolous. The album was released on July 28, 2009, by Desert Storm Records, Street Family Records and Def Jam Recordings. The album's first two singles were released simultaneously on May 26, 2009. "Throw It in the Bag" features The-Dream and "My Time" features Jeremih.  Two more singles were subsequently released, Everything, Everyday, Everywhere" featuring Keri Hilson and "Money Goes, Honey Stay" featuring Jay-Z.

Background
A deluxe album was released on the same day as the standard release. The edition features a bonus DVD, (Loso's Way, the movie). The movie features Fabolous (and three of his friends). Fabolous is leaving a restaurant when he is shot. His friends quickly rush Fabolous to the hospital, but are stopped by the police after running a red light. Fellow rapper Styles P has a role in the movie.  DJ Clue, DJ Khaled, Jadakiss, Swizz Beatz, DJ Envy, and Ryan Leslie make cameo appearances. The movie Loso's Way runs for 33:03 minutes. In order to view Loso's Way the movie, the deluxe album Loso's Way must be purchased.

Critical reception
Loso's Way got a score of 66 out of 100 from Metacritic based on positive reviews from music critics. Several critics pointed out that the album revealed Fabolous' lyrical strengths and weaknesses. 

Slava Kuperstein of HipHopDX gave the album a 3.5 out of five stars and stated that Loso's Way may be the first completely focused album Fabolous has ever dropped, and the results confirm what all the hype was for in the first place.

Commercial performance
The album debuted at number one on the Billboard 200, selling over 99,000 copies in its first week. It became Fabolous' first and only album to top the chart.

Track listing

Charts

Weekly charts

Year-end charts

Certifications

References

2009 albums
Fabolous albums
Albums produced by the Alchemist (musician)
Albums produced by DJ Khalil
Albums produced by Grind Music
Albums produced by Jermaine Dupri
Albums produced by J.U.S.T.I.C.E. League
Albums produced by No I.D.
Albums produced by Ryan Leslie
Albums produced by the Runners
Albums produced by Tricky Stewart
Concept albums
Def Jam Recordings albums
Hip hop soundtracks